William Youmans is an American Broadway, film and television actor and singer, best known for originating the roles of John Jacob Astor in Titanic: the Musical, and Doctor Dillamond in Wicked. He made a return to Wicked this year on March 7, 2023.

Life and career
Youmans was born into a performing family; his great-uncle was Broadway composer Vincent Youmans. William made his Broadway debut in 1981, playing Leo Hubbard in The Little Foxes.  He performed numerous roles in the original production of Big River and sang the role of Alcindoro in the Baz Luhrmann-directed revival of La Bohème. He also portrayed Sir Richard Bingham in The Pirate Queen and performed in the play The Farnsworth Invention.

In 1997 he originated the role of John Jacob Astor in Titanic, and 2003, originated the role of Doctor Dillamond in Wicked. After a San Francisco tryout, in which the role was played by John Horton, the original Broadway production opened October 30, 2003, starring Kristin Chenoweth and Idina Menzel. Youmans left the role on July 24, 2005, and later reprised the role in the Chicago production for a limited engagement from December 12, 2006, through January 14, 2007. He can be heard on the show's original Broadway cast recording.

Off-Broadway
In 1986 he was in the Off Broadway play THE WIDOW CLAIRE by Horton Foote 
He played a few different roles in the musical Coraline.

Film and television
Youmans appeared in the films Mrs. Soffel, Compromising Positions, Nadine, Fresh Horses and the independent film Last Supper.

Youmans' first television appearance was a made-for-television movie of a Mark Twain story, The Private History of a Campaign That Failed.  He has since appeared on episodes of The Equalizer, Spenser: For Hire, NYPD Blue, Law & Order and Law & Order: Special Victims Unit.

Filmography

External links

Year of birth missing (living people)
Living people
American male film actors
American male musical theatre actors
American male television actors